Cosmas's continuators were various Bohemian authors who wrote continuations in Latin of the Chronica Boemorum of Cosmas of Prague, which ends with Cosmas's death in 1125. They primarily wrote annals rather than true chronicles.

The first continuator was an anonymous canon of Vyšehrad, whose work covers the years 1125–1142, essentially being annals of the reign of Soběslav I. In the 1170s, an anonymous monk of Sázava combined a history of his monastery from its foundation—De exordio Zazavensis monasterii—with a continuation of Cosmas down to 1162. Together these two works are called the first continuation.

Vincent of Prague, whose chronicle covers the years 1140–1167 of the reign of Vladislav II, may also be regarded as a continuator of Cosmas. His work was continued down to 1198 by Gerlach of Milevsko.

The anonymous so-called second continuation of Cosmas was compiled at Saint Vitus' Cathedral in Prague shortly before 1300. It includes annals that cover the years 1196–1283, like the Stories of Wencelas I, the Stories of Přemysl Otakar II (or Annales Otakariani) and the Narration on the Bad Years after the Death of Přemysl Otakar II for the reigns of Václav I (1230–1253) and Otakar II (1253–1278).

The two latest continuators are Henry the Carver, whose Chronicle of the abbey of Žďár ends in 1300, and Henry of Heimburg, whose Chronicle of the Czechs ends in the same year.

The continuators differ from Cosmas in key ways. They eschewed the narrative chronicle in favour of the annals, and they dispensed with classical references in favour of biblical ones. Although the canon of Vyšehrad compared the hero of the battle of Chlumec in 1126 to Achilles, the 13th-century continuators prefer comparing the Czechs to the ancient Israelites. This annalistical biblical form of historiography was unique in central Europe.

Editions
Bláhová, Marie; Fiala, Zdeněk (eds.). Pokračovatelé Kosmovi. Prague, 1974.

References

Medieval Czech history
Latin-language literature